2nd (City of London) Battalion, London Regiment (Royal Fusiliers) was an infantry battalion of the British Army.

History
It was raised at Westminster in 1860 as the 46th Middlesex Rifle Volunteer Corps, renumbered 23rd Middlesex Rifle Volunteer Corps in 1880. On the formation of the Volunteer Force in the early 1880s it became 2nd Volunteer Battalion, Royal Fusiliers (City of London Regiment), an identity it retained until the Territorial Force was set up in 1908. It then became 2nd (City of London) Battalion, London Regiment (Royal Fusiliers). In September 1914, when it was posted to Malta, it was re-designated as the 1/2nd Battalion and retained that identity until that regiment disbanded in 1937.

In January 1915, the Battalion was transferred to France, and first went into the trenches in February, near Armentières, later serving in the Ypres salient. Its first major action was at Gommecourt on the first day of the Battle of the Somme, 1 July 1916, as part of 169th Brigade, 56th (London) Division. The Battalion was in reserve in the morning but, in the early afternoon, was tasked to renew efforts to take the German trenches, an advance of about 200 yards across open ground. It came under heavy machine gun fire from its left flank as well as artillery shelling, and sustained heavy casualties without achieving its objectives. Nine officers and 171 men of the Battalion were killed.

The battalion is mentioned on both the Royal Fusiliers War Memorial and London Troops Memorial, whilst its World War One casualties are mentioned by name in the roll of honour at the Royal Fusiliers Chapel in St Sepulchre-without-Newgate.

After the Great War, the battalion  resumed its affiliation to the Royal Fusiliers, becoming 9th (2nd City of London) Battalion, The Royal Fusiliers (City of London Regiment). The battalion saw service in World War II, notably in the final stages of the Tunisian campaign in mid-1943, and later in Italy throughout most of the Italian campaign, most notably at Salerno, Anzio, the Gothic Line and later the Spring 1945 offensive in Italy.

The battalion was transferred to another corps in 1947, becoming 624th Light Anti-Aircraft Regiment Royal Artillery (Royal Fusiliers). It finally merged with 8th (1st City of London) Battalion, The Royal Fusiliers (City of London Regiment) in 1961 to form The City of London Battalion, Royal Fusiliers (City of London Regiment). That battalion was reduced to company strength in 1967 and is now known as 3 (City of London Fusiliers) Company, London Regiment.

References

Royal Fusiliers
02
Military units and formations in the City of Westminster
Military units and formations in London
Military units and formations established in 1908